Mikael Bo Renberg (born 5 May 1972) is a Swedish former professional ice hockey player, last playing for Skellefteå AIK in Elitserien. He spent ten seasons in the National Hockey League (NHL) and eight in the Swedish Elite League.

Playing career
Renberg began his NHL career with the Philadelphia Flyers, who drafted him 40th overall in the 1990 NHL Entry Draft.  He set the Flyers' club record for most points in a season scored by a rookie with 82 points (38 goals and 44 assists) in 83 games.  Renberg played with them for four seasons and in Philadelphia he became popular with fans for playing on the formidable "Legion of Doom" line with John LeClair and Eric Lindros.  Renberg, and the top line helped the team to the 1997 Stanley Cup Finals, where they were swept in four games by the Detroit Red Wings.

After the Stanley Cup run the Flyers offered restricted free agent Chris Gratton a five-year, $16.5M contract which Gratton's former team, the Tampa Bay Lightning, declined to match. Under the NHL's free agency rules the Flyers had to compensate the Lightning with four first-round picks in future NHL Entry Drafts. Seeking to reacquire the four draft picks Renberg was traded to the Lightning with Karl Dykhuis, and was immediately named the Lightning's captain. 16 months later the teams would virtually undo the trade, sending Renberg back to Philadelphia with Daymond Langkow for Gratton and Mike Sillinger. Renberg played parts of two more seasons for the Flyers until he was traded to the Phoenix Coyotes in exchange for Rick Tocchet a few days before the 2000 NHL trade deadline. He finished the 1999–2000 season with the Coyotes then returned to Sweden to play for Luleå HF. After one season in Sweden he returned to the NHL by signing with the Toronto Maple Leafs. After three seasons in Toronto, Renberg once again returned to play for Luleå HF to be close to his family.  After captaining Luleå from 2005–07, he moved onto nearby rival Skellefteå AIK (SAIK).  After two seasons with SAIK, Renberg decided to retire due to persistent groin injury problems that cut his final season short.

International play
Renberg's first international experience came at the European Junior Championship, in which he helped Sweden secure a gold medal by scoring 7 goals in 6 game against Europe's top competition. Renberg next wore the three crowns in the 1992 World Juniors and scored six goals and four assists, playing with future NHL stars Peter Forsberg, Michael Nylander, and Markus Näslund. Renberg finished fourth in the scoring behind his three aforementioned countrymen. Despite the high offensive output of the Swedes, they only returned home with a silver medal.

After graduating out of junior, Renberg represented Sweden again at the 1993 World Championships (WC). He continued his torrid international pace by being named to the tournaments' all-star team after netting 5 goals and 3 assists in 8 games. However, like before, Renberg and Sweden again went home with silver.

Prior to 1998 professionals could not participate in the Olympics. As Renberg was in the NHL he could not partake in Team Sweden's gold medal over Canada at the 1994 games in Lillehammer. But for the 1998 Olympics held in Nagano, Japan, Renberg was named to the team to defend its gold and was assigned to play on the first line with friends and countrymen Peter Forsberg and Daniel Alfredsson. Renberg tallied a goal and two assist in Sweden's four game, as the Swedish roster finished in fifth place at the 1998 Olympics playing against older teams in the Canadians, Americans, and Russians.

Renberg would continue representing his country in international tournaments throughout his career. After the Olympic disappointment, at the 1998 WC, Renberg and the Swedes won the gold medal, the first for their country since 1992. Renberg final two WC's were in 2001 and 2003, with the 2001 team taking Renberg home a bronze medal. Renberg's second and final try at the Olympics in 2002 held in Salt Lake City, United States. Again, despite countryman Mats Sundin leading the Olympics in scoring, Renberg and the Swedes went home empty-handed as fifth-place finishers. Unfortunately, Renberg was not a part of the team at the 2006 Olympics where his countrymen led by Nicklas Lidström and Henrik Lundqvist reached the promised land once more to win the gold medal at the Olympic Games.

Records and milestones
 Philadelphia Flyers' franchise record for most points in a season by a rookie, 82 (1993–94)
 Scored 200th NHL career point with an assist vs. Vancouver Canucks (1 December 1996)
 Scored 100th NHL career goal vs. Pittsburgh Penguins (16 February 1997)

Career statistics

Regular season and playoffs

International
International stats are final, as per Mikeal Renberg's retirement

Awards
 Gold medal at the Junior European Championships in 1990.
 Named to the World Championships All-Star Team in 1993.
 Named to the SEL All-Star team in 1993, 1995, and 2001
 Named to the NHL All-Rookie Team in 1994
 Awarded the Pelle Lindbergh Memorial (Most Improved Player - Philadelphia Flyers) in 1994.
 Awarded the Yanick Dupre Memorial (Class Guy Award - Philadelphia Flyers) in 1995.
 Awarded the Viking Award (Top Swedish player in the NHL) in 1995.
 Gold Medal at the World Championships in 1998.
 Awarded the Golden Puck (Elitserien Player of the Year) in 2001.
 He was inducted into the Piteå Wall of Fame in 2006.

References

External links
 

1972 births
Living people
Ice hockey players at the 1998 Winter Olympics
Ice hockey players at the 2002 Winter Olympics
Luleå HF players
Olympic ice hockey players of Sweden
People from Piteå
Philadelphia Flyers draft picks
Philadelphia Flyers players
Phoenix Coyotes players
Skellefteå AIK players
Swedish expatriate ice hockey players in Canada
Swedish expatriate ice hockey players in the United States
Swedish ice hockey right wingers
Tampa Bay Lightning players
Toronto Maple Leafs players
Sportspeople from Norrbotten County